Sium sisarum, commonly known as skirret, is a perennial plant of the family Apiaceae sometimes grown as a root vegetable. The English name skirret is derived from the Middle English 'skirwhit' or 'skirwort', meaning 'white root'. In Scotland it is known as crummock. Its Danish name sukkerrod, Dutch name suikerwortel  and German name "Zuckerwurzel" translate as 'sugar root'.

These are used as a vegetable in the same manner as the common salsify, black salsify and the parsnip.

History

The plant is of Chinese origin, but arrived in Europe by or before Roman times. It is presumed to be the siser mentioned by Pliny the Elder as a favourite of the Emperor Tiberius, though this may have also been a reference to a parsnip or carrot.

The twelfth-century Benedictine abbess Hildegard von Bingen discussed the medicinal properties of skirret in her work Physica:

 Skirret (gerla) is hot and dry. Eaten in moderation, it is not very helpful or harmful. If someone should eat a lot of it, its heat and dryness would stir up fevers in him and harm his intestines. A person whose face has weak skin, which easily splits, should pound skirret in a mortar and add oil. When he goes to bed at night, he should rub it on his face, continuing until he is healed.

A 1390 manuscript The Forme of Cury used by King Richard II of England's master cooks included two recipes for fritters that included 'skyrwates'.

Maud Grieve in A Modern Herbal mentions that it has been cultivated in Great Britain since 1548 and is supposed to be a useful diet in chest complaints.
The seventeenth-century English herbalist Nicholas Culpeper said about the plant:

 Sisari, secacul.  Of Scirrets. They are hot and moist, of good nourishment, something windy, as all roots are; by reason of which, they provoke venery, they stir up appetite, and provoke urine.

John Gerard's Herball or General Historie of Plantes of 1633 describes skirret thus:

 Sisarum. Skirrets. The roots of the Skirret be moderately hot and moist; they be easily concocted; they nourish meanly, and yeeld a reasonable good iuice: but they are something windie, by reason whereof they also prouoke lust. They be eaten boiled, with vineger, salt, and a little oile, after the manner of a sallad, and oftentimes they be fried in oile and butter, and also dressed after other fashions, according to the skil of the cooke, and the taste of the eater...

When boiled and served with butter, the roots form a dish, declared by the seventeenth-century agriculturist John Worlidge in 1682, to be "the sweetest, whitest, and most pleasant of roots".

Cultivation
It can be grown from seeds, but may also be started from root divisions. The roots are best eaten when the plant is dormant during the winter, as in the spring, the roots become woody and covered with small hairs. Lack of moisture can also make the root more fibrous. The plant prefers sandy and moist soil.

Culinary use
The roots are scrubbed, cut into lengths, boiled, and served like parsnips or carrots. Skirret roots can be stewed, baked, roasted, fried in batter as fritter, or creamed, and also be grated and used raw in salads. A woody core may be present in some roots, though this seems to be variable in different plants. If present, it should be removed before cooking because it is difficult to remove after.

Recipes

Lentils and Skirrets with Bacon (Medieval recipe)
Put 125 g of bacon, chicken giblets of one chicken, and 8 garlic cloves into a stewing pan with 1 litre of water and cook 30 minutes, skimming often. Strain and reserve the bacon and giblets. Put the stock  in a clean stewing pan with 3 cups (750 ml) of  water. Add 500 g of green or brown lentils, 3 teaspoons of salt, and half a teaspoon of ground ginger. Chop the giblets and add this to the pot. Chop part of the bacon, enough to yield half a cup (50 g) and add this to the lentil mixture.

Cook 20 minutes over medium heat, then add 1 cup (100g) of sliced skirrets. Continue cooking until the skirrets are tender (about 15 minutes), then add a quarter cup of chopped parsley, half a cup of chopped spring onions, and a quarter cup of dill. Serve immediately in a bowl with the remaining piece of boiled bacon on top.

— Reconstructed from a Medieval recipe from Poland.

Fritters of Skirrets, Parsnips and Apples (1460)
Take skirrets, parsnips and apples, and parboil them. Make a batter of flour and eggs. Cast ale, saffron and salt into it. Wet them in the batter and fry them in oil or in grease. Pour on almond milk and serve it forth.

— From John Russell, Boke of Nurture, c. 1460

Skirret Pie (1653)
Take a quarter of a peck of Skirrets blanched, and sliced, season them with three Nutmegs, and an ounce of Cinnamon, and three ounces of Sugar, and ten quartered Dates, and the Marrow of three bones, rouled in yolks of Eggs, and one quarter of a pound of Ringo roots, and preserved Lettice, a sliced Lemon, four blades of Mace, three or four branches of preserved Barberries, and a half a pound of Butter, then let it stand one hour in the oven, then put a caudle made of white Wine, Verjuyce, Butter, and Sugar, put into the pye when it comes out of the oven.

— From Elizabeth Grey, Countess of Kent, A True Gentlewomans Delight, 1653

Skirret Pie (1654)
Take your skirrets and boil them, skin them, then cut them to lengths about two or three inches. Wash them with yolks of eggs and season with salt, ginger, cinnamon, nutmeg. Put to them some chestnuts boiled and blanched and some yolks of hard-boiled eggs split, and lay over some sliced lemon. Put over butter and close it in a raised coffin.

— From The Receipt Book of Joseph Cooper, Cook to Charles I, 1654

Skirret Pie (1727)
Boil your biggest skirrets and blanch and season them with cinnamon, nutmeg, and a very little ginger and sugar. Your pye being ready lay in your skirrets; season also the marrow of three or four bones with cinnamon, sugar, a little salt and grated bread. Lay the marrow in your pye and the yolks of hard eggs, a handful of chestnuts boiled and blanched, and some candied orange-peel in slices. Lay butter on the top and lid your pye. Let your caudle be white wine and sugar, thicken it with the yolks of eggs, and when the pye is baked pour it in and serve it hot. Scrape sugar on it.

— From E. Smith, The Compleat Housewife, 1727

Skirret Pie (1761)
Take the largest skirrets you can get & parboyle them & peel them & season them with cinnimon & powder sugar & put them in a dish with a good deal of fresh butter & some sliced citron & candid orange peel & candid eringoroot, 3 spoonfuls of rose water, 4 of white wine, some Jerusalem hartichokes boyled & sliced. Make it with cold butter paste. When it coms out of the oven, have ready a caudle made of half a pint of sack, some sugar & nutmeg & the yolks of 4 eggs & a print of butter poured on it very hot & the lid laid on it again.

— From The Cookbook of Unknown Ladies, circa 1761

Skirret Fritters (1789)
To a pint of pulp of skirrets add a spoonful of flour, the yolks of four eggs, sugar and spice. Make them into a thick batter, and fry them quick.

— From John Farley The London Art of Cookery, and Housekeeper's Complete Assistant. 1789

Notes

References

External links
 Plants for a Future Database report

sisarum
Root vegetables
Perennial vegetables
Edible Apiaceae
Plants described in 1753
Taxa named by Carl Linnaeus